Nemaiah Valley, also spelled Nemiah Valley and Nemaia Valley, is an unincorporated locality and First Nations reserve and ranching community between Chilko Lake and the Taseko Lakes in the Chilcotin District of the Central Interior of British Columbia.

It is the home of the Xeni Gwet'in band of the Tsilhqot'in people.  Associated Indian Reserves are the Garden Indian Reserve No. 2, Tanakut Indian Reserve No. 4, Lohbiee Indian Reserve No. 3, and Lezbye Indian Reserve No.6.

The name of Konni Lake, located near the eastern end of Nemaiah Valley, is derived from the Tsilhqot'in language name Xeni.

Origin of name

"Nemiah was the leader [of the people who lived at Konni Lake] who first met with white chiefs 10 generations ago.", (quote in BCGNIS from The Traveller's Guide to Aboriginal British Columbia, by Cheryl Coull; Whitecap Books, Vancouver; 1996).

References 
 Lane, Robert (1953) Cultural Relations of the Chilcotin Indians of West Central British Columbia, Ph.D. dissertation, University of Washington.
 Lane, Robert (1981) "Chilcotin." In June Helm (ed.), Handbook of North American Indians: Subarctic, Vol.6., Smithsonian Institution, Washington.

External links 
 Xeni Gwet'in homepage
 Friends of the Nemaiah Valley website

Populated places in the Chilcotin
Unincorporated settlements in British Columbia
Indian reserves in British Columbia
Tsilhqot'in communities
Chilcotin Ranges